Rejang is an Austronesian language predominantly spoken by the Rejang people in southwestern parts of Sumatra (Bengkulu), Indonesia. There are five dialects, spread from mountainous region to the coastal region of Bengkulu, including the Musi (Musai) dialect, the Lebong dialect, the Kebanagung dialect, the Rawas (Awes) dialect, and the Pesisir dialect.

Classification
Rejang is not obviously close to other Malayo-Polynesian languages in Sumatra. McGinn (2009) classified it among the Bidayuh languages of Borneo, closest to Bukar–Sadong. It may be that it is related to the newly described language Nasal, but that is speculative at this point. Robert Blust and Alexander Smith classified Rejang as part of Greater North Borneo languages (2017a, 2017b).

Dialects
Rejang has five different dialects. Speakers of each dialects are able to communicate with one another, in spite of lexical and phonological differences. The four dialects of Rejangs are Curup, Lebong, Kepahiang, and Utara. Among all dialects, Awes dialect is the hardest for the speakers of other dialects.

Writing system
Rejang was written with the Rejang script for a long time. The script is thought to predate the introduction of Islam to the area in the 12th century CE, although the earliest attested document has been dated to the mid-18th century. It is traditionally written on bamboo, buffalo horn, bark or copper plates. It was only recently that the Latin alphabet was introduced as a way of writing the language.

Phonology

Consonants 

A trill  is also present, but only in loanwords.

Vowels

Vocabulary

Astronomical terms

Gender

Colour

Pronouns

Numbers

Days of the week

Prepositions

Place

Basic elements

Sample text

The following is a sample text in Rejang, of Article 1 of the Universal Declaration of Human Rights (by the United Nations):

Gloss (word-to-word):
Article 1 – All human was born independent, has an equal rights. They are endowed a way to think and heart; then they need to  each other in the taste of brotherhood.

Translation (grammatical):
Article 1 – All human beings are born free and equal in rights. They are endowed with reason and conscience and should act towards one another in a spirit of brotherhood.

Notes

Bibliography

External links

 Richard McGinn, Archive of Materials for the Study of the Rejang of Sumatra. 
 Rejang in Unicode Table

Greater North Borneo languages
Languages of Indonesia